The 2019–20 synchronized skating season began on July 1, 2019, and ended on June 30, 2020. Running concurrent with the 2019–20 figure skating season. During this season, elite synchronized skating teams were set to compete in the ISU Championship level at the 2020 World Championships which were cancelled due to the COVID-19 pandemic, and through the Challenger Series. They also competed at various other elite level international and national competitions

Competitions 
The 2019–20 season included the following major competitions.

 Key

International medalists

References 

2019 in figure skating
2020 in figure skating
Seasons in synchronized skating